Allen Glover Lanier (June 25, 1946 – August 14, 2013) was an American musician who played keyboards and rhythm guitar. He was an original member of Blue Öyster Cult.

Lanier wrote several songs for Blue Öyster Cult albums, including "True Confessions", "Tenderloin", "Searchin' for Celine", "In Thee", and "Lonely Teardrops". In addition to his work with Blue Öyster Cult, he also contributed to music by Patti Smith, John Cale, Jim Carroll, The Dictators and The Clash, among others. He lived with Patti Smith in Manhattan for several years during the 1970s.

Lanier first performed with the band (then known as Soft White Underbelly) in 1967. He left the group in 1985, and was replaced by Tommy Zvoncheck (of Clarence Clemons and Public Image Ltd fame). Lanier returned to the band in 1987, touring constantly until the fall of 2006.

Without any official announcement from Blue Öyster Cult, the band's line-up photograph was updated to remove Lanier, and a brief mention on the page for Richie Castellano has the following to say:
"Since the retirement of Allen Lanier, Richie has switched over to the guitars/keyboards position, both of which he's quite the master!". That would seem to indicate that Allen Lanier retired from both Blue Öyster Cult and music in 2007, having played his last concert with them in late 2006. He would rejoin them for their 40th anniversary concert in New York in November 2012, which proved to be his last appearance with the band.

Lanier's death was announced by Blue Öyster Cult on August 14, 2013. According to their official Facebook page, "Allen succumbed to complications from C.O.P.D." Lead singer Eric Bloom posted the following:

Discography

Blue Öyster Cult
Studio albums
 Blue Öyster Cult (1972)
 Tyranny and Mutation (1973)
 Secret Treaties (1974)
 Agents of Fortune (1976)
 Spectres (1977)
 Mirrors (1979)
 Cultösaurus Erectus (1980)
 Fire of Unknown Origin (1981)
 The Revölution by Night (1983)
 Imaginos (1988)
 Bad Channels (1992)
 Heaven Forbid (1998)
 Curse of the Hidden Mirror (2001)

References

External links

1946 births
2013 deaths
American rock guitarists
American male guitarists
American rock keyboardists
American heavy metal keyboardists
Blue Öyster Cult members
Guitarists from New York (state)
20th-century American guitarists
20th-century American keyboardists
Deaths from chronic obstructive pulmonary disease